Enonvesi is a rather large lake in the Vuoksi main catchment area. It is located in the regions of Southern Savonia and Northern Savonia in Finland. It is a part of the Saimaa lake system.

References

Saimaa
Lakes of Enonkoski